Rutherford School was a secondary modern school, later comprehensive school, in Paddington, London, England. It opened in 1960 and in 1981 amalgamated with Sarah Siddons Girls' School and Paddington School to form the North Westminster Community School. The site is now occupied by the Ark King Solomon Academy.

It was built from 1958 to 1960, designed by the architects Leonard Manasseh and Ian Baker, and is a Grade II* listed building.

Alumni include actors Phil Daniels and Danny John-Jules, musicians Paul Hardcastle and Courtney Pine, footballers Tony Grealish, Jeff Chandler and DJ Gary Crowley.

Both Barry Hines (the author of A Kestrel for a Knave) and Bob Wilson (former Arsenal FC and national Scotland goalkeeper and broadcaster) taught at Rutherford Comprehensive School in the early 1960s.

References

Educational institutions established in 1960
1960 establishments in England
Defunct schools in the City of Westminster
Educational institutions disestablished in 1981
1981 disestablishments in England
Paddington
Grade II* listed buildings in the City of Westminster